Go Bananas! is the 30th album released by the Australian children's music group, the Wiggles. Kylie Minogue guest stars as the pink Wiggle. This album won the 2009 Aria Award for Best Children's Album.

Track listing
 Introduction
 Monkey Man (featuring Kylie Minogue)
 The Chicken Walk
 Kangaroo Jumping
 Bless You, Bless You, Bonnie Bee
 The Unicorn (featuring Morgan Crowley)
 The Monkey, The Bird And The Bear
 Little Robin Redbreast
 The Dingle Puck Goat
 One Monkey Who
 Wags The Dog Is Chasing His Tail
 Cock-A-Doodle-Doo
 The Lion Is King
 Rusty the Cowboy (featuring John Waters)
 Sing, Sing!
 The Poor King
 Here Comes A Camel
 Dickory, Dickory, Dare
 Frankie The Blue Eyed Koala
 I’m A Scary Tiger
 Hodley Podley
 Standing Like A Statue
 Kangaroo, Kangaroo, What Do You See?
 Tassie Devil
 Once I Saw A Little Bird
 Hippo, Hippo!

Video

Go Bananas! was released on ABC DVD in 2009.

Song List
Monkey Man (featuring Kylie Minogue) 
The Chicken Walk 
Kangaroo Jumping 
Bless You, Bless You, Bonnie Bee 
The Monkey, the Bird and the Bear 
Little Robin Redbreast 
The Dingle Puck Goat 
One Monkey Who 
Wags the Dog Is Chasing His Tail 
Cock-A-Doodle-Doo 
The Lion Is King 
Rusty The Cowboy (featuring John Waters) 
Sing, Sing! 
The Poor King 
Here Comes a Camel 
Dickory, Dickory, Dare 
Frankie the Blue-Eyed Koala 
I'm a Scary Tiger 
Hodley Podley 
Standing Like a Statue 
Kangaroo, Kangaroo, What Do You See? 
Tassie Devil 
Once I Saw a Little Bird 
Hippo, Hippo!

References

External links

The Wiggles albums
The Wiggles videos
2009 albums
ARIA Award-winning albums
2009 video albums
Australian children's musical films